The Route du Rhum is a single person transatlantic race the 2022 race was the 12th edition and had six classes with 138 boats taking part. The events status as a qualification for event for the Vendee Globe lead to the largest most competitive fleet of IMOCA 60 class yachts gathered todate.  In his first attempt at the race Charles Caudrelier took line honours in a new race record time  on the Maxi Multihull Edmond de Rothschild in six days, 19 hours and 47 minutes.

Incident
Delayed Start

Loss of IMOCA 60

Collisions with shipping and fellow Competitors

Running aground

Diversions

Capsize of Multi 50

Results

Ultime

Multi 50

IMOCA 60

Class 40

Rhum Monohull

Rhum Multihull

External Links
 
 Official You Tube Channel

Reference

Route du Rhum
2022 in sailing
Route du Rhum
Single-handed sailing competitions
Class40 competitions
IMOCA 60 competitions